Alfred "Lash" LaRue (June 15, 1917 – May 21, 1996) was a popular western motion picture star of the 1940s and 1950s.

Biography

Early life and education 
Born Alfred LaRue in Gretna, Louisiana in 1917, he was reared in various towns throughout Louisiana, but in his teens the family moved to Los Angeles, California, where he attended St. John's Military Academy and the College of the Pacific. Strangely, his California death records reportedly indicate the actor's father's surname was Wilson and that Lash was born in Michigan.

Film career 
LaRue was originally screen tested by Warner Bros. but was rejected because he looked too much like Humphrey Bogart, then one of the studio's contract stars. He began acting in films in 1944 as Al LaRue, appearing in two musicals and a serial before being given a role in a Western film that would result in his being stereotyped as a cowboy for the remainder of his career. He was given the name "Lash" because of the -long bullwhip he used to help bring down the bad guys.

After appearing in all three of the Eddie Dean Cinecolor singing Westerns in 1945-46, LaRue starred in B-westerns from 1947 to 1951, at first for Poverty Row studio Producers Releasing Corporation, then for Eagle-Lion when they took over the studio, and later for producer Ron Ormond.

The popularity of LaRue's first appearance as the "Cheyenne Kid" (who appeared initially as a sidekick of singing cowboy hero Eddie Dean in the 1945 musical Song of Old Wyoming), using a whip expertly to disarm villains, paved the way for LaRue to star in his own 8-film Cheyenne Kid feature film series in 1947, made by PRC. LaRue inherited from Buster Crabbe a comic sidekick in the form of "Fuzzy Q. Jones" (played by Al St. John). It was at this time that he developed his image as cowboy hero Lash LaRue, dressed all in black. He then starred in his own 11-film "Lash LaRue" series, produced by "Western Adventure Films", in which he played a character actually named "Marshall Lash LaRue". Those 11 films (from 1948 to 1951) are the ones that western movie fans refer to as the "Lash LaRue film series" (see Filmography below).

He was different from the usual cowboy hero of the era. Dressed in black, he spoke with a "city tough-guy" accent somewhat like that of Humphrey Bogart, whom he physically resembled. His use of a bullwhip, however, was what set him apart from contemporary cowboy stars such as Gene Autry and Roy Rogers. His influence was felt throughout the dying medium of B-westerns; for example, he had an imitator, Whip Wilson, who starred in his own brief series, and even Roy Rogers started using a bullwhip in some of his Republic Studios Westerns made during the same period.

LaRue made frequent personal appearances at small-town movie theaters that were showing his films during his heyday of 1948 to 1951, a common practice for cowboy stars in those days. However, his skillful displays of stunts with his whip, done live on movie theater stages, also convinced young Western fans that there was at least one cowboy hero who could perform in real life the things he did on screen. He continued working in films and television until he retired in 1990.

Personal life
For a time he was married to Reno Browne, a B-western actress, who together with Dale Evans was one of only two Western actresses ever to have their own comic book fashioned after her character. He later married Barbra Fuller, a radio, film and television actress. Their marriage lasted around 15 months; they wed February 23, 1951 in Yuma, Arizona, and divorced June 2, 1952. They had no children but did have a godchild, child actor J.P. Sloane, the son of "Television's Singing Troubadour" Jimmie Jackson and "Television's Hollywood Hostess" Anita Coleman.

Television
In the later 1950s, LaRue was featured in archival footage numerous times on the children's program The Gabby Hayes Show. He appeared several times on the syndicated television series 26 Men, true stories of the Arizona Rangers. LaRue also appeared on Jimmie Jackson's television show Memory Lane. He appeared seven times in different roles in the 1956 TV western Judge Roy Bean. One of his roles on Judge Roy Bean was as the outlaw John Wesley Hardin. He portrayed another real-life criminal, Doc Barker, in the TV series Gangbusters, which was later recut into the film Guns Don't Argue. LaRue and Steve Brodie shared the role (from 1959–1961) of Sheriff Johnny Behan in Cochise County, Arizona, on ABC's The Life and Legend of Wyatt Earp, starring Hugh O'Brian. LaRue appeared five times; Brodie, nine times.

A role as the villain in a pornographic western, Hard on the Trail, in 1972, led him to repentance as a missionary for ten years, as he had not been informed of the adult nature of the film and would not have consented to appear in the film. He did not actually appear in any of the pornographic scenes. The film was later released without the pornographic scenes and re-titled Hard Trail in an attempt to eliminate the double entendre.

Musician 

LaRue often returned to Louisiana and East Texas, where he grew up. He became a regular at the jam sessions at the Dew Drop Inn in New Orleans. In his autobiography, Backbeat, drummer Earl Palmer recalled:Lots of white people wanted to come to the Dew Drop. Most were turned away, but they let a few in. Every time the cowboy actor Lash LaRue came in town, he came by. He played a hell of a guitar and was a regular guy that people liked.

Faith
He was a born-again Christian who was baptized at Shreveport's Baptist Tabernacle by pastor Jimmy G. Tharpe. Tharpe initially met LaRue in Alexandria, Louisiana, when LaRue was visiting the home of his daughter. He and another minister, Don Chelette of Alexandria, were proselytizing door-to-door when they met LaRue and his daughter. Tharpe thereafter declared a "Lash LaRue Day" at his church at which LaRue gave his Christian testimony: "He came, and we had a wonderful service in our gymnasium. There were thirty-seven people saved in the gym that day. He cut paper from the mouth of Debbye, my daughter, with his whip. We all rejoiced over Lash LaRue and his testimony. I introduced Lash to others, and several churches invited him to give his testimony, and he accepted."

LaRue later was an evangelist who worked with alcoholics in St. Petersburg, Florida. He was one of several people injured by a tornado while in attendance at the Missouri State Fair in Sedalia, Missouri, on August 20, 1952.

Death
LaRue died of emphysema in 1996 at Providence Saint Joseph Medical Center in Burbank, California. He had recently undergone triple-bypass surgery and suffered from emphysema. He was cremated at Forest Lawn Memorial Park, Glendale, California. He was survived by his wife, Frances Bramlett LaRue, three sons and three daughters. He had reportedly been married at least ten times.

Legacy 
LaRue was mentioned in the 1973 song "Childhood – 1949", written and recorded by Bobby Goldsboro as the B-side to his hit single "Summer (The First Time)".

He is of many classic western stars mentioned in the 1974 Statler Brothers song "Whatever Happened to Randolph Scott?"

Writer/singer/producer Bruce Blackman of the pop group Starbuck wrote and recorded the tribute song "Lash LaRue", included on their 1976 album Moonlight Feels Right.

He was mentioned in the Shel Silverstein song "The Great Conch Train Robbery" in Silverstein's 1980 album of the same name.

A fifth season episode of Rockford Files, "A Material Difference", has Rockford confronting his notorious sidekick Angel Martin at an outdoor restaurant, asking of his leather jacket and dark clothing, "What are you, a clone of Lash LaRue?"

LaRue is seen on the 1986 Johnny Cash and Waylon Jennings duet album Heroes. On the back cover, LaRue is standing with the duo.

In Quentin Tarantino's 1994 film Pulp Fiction, Winston Wolfe (Harvey Keitel) jokingly refers to Vincent Vega (John Travolta) as "Lash LaRue".

Professional wrestler Mark LeRoux borrowed his ring name from LaRue, dubbing himself "Lash LeRoux" in 1999.

Filmography 
 

Comics
Lash LaRue Western comic books were published first by Fawcett Comics (issues #1 through 46) and later by Charlton Comics (issues #47 through 84), between 1949 and 1961. The first issue alone today is worth upwards of $1,000 in near mint condition. They were among the most popular Western-themed comics of the era. Initially, LaRue and other Western stars weren't paid royalties by Fawcett; they were satisfied with just the publicity. (AC later published two reprint editions in 1990.) LaRue comics sold well with a total of 12 million copies in 1952 alone. Many stories featured his godson, J.P. Sloane.

Later films

References

Bibliography
 Lash LaRue, the King of the Bullwhip, by Chuck Thornton and David Rothel (Empire Publishing, NC, 1988). .
 The King of the Bullwhip: Lash LaRue, the Man, not the Legend, by Charles M. Sharpe (Sharpeco, NC, 1996). ASIN B0006QS5T6.

External links

 Lash LaRue-bio on (re)Search my Trash

1917 births
1996 deaths
People from Gretna, Louisiana
Baptists from Louisiana
Cajun people
American male film actors
Male Western (genre) film actors
Deaths from emphysema
Male actors from Louisiana
Burials at Forest Lawn Memorial Park (Glendale)
20th-century American male actors
20th-century Baptists